Pascaline Freiher (born 11 January 1966) is a French former alpine skier who competed in the 1988 Winter Olympics.

External links
 sports-reference.com

1966 births
Living people
French female alpine skiers
Olympic alpine skiers of France
Alpine skiers at the 1988 Winter Olympics
Universiade medalists in alpine skiing
Sportspeople from Haute-Savoie
Universiade bronze medalists for France
Competitors at the 1991 Winter Universiade